Pantherodes is a genus of moth in the family Geometridae.

Species
 Pantherodes arizonensis
 Pantherodes colubraria
 Pantherodes conglomerata
 Pantherodes cornifrons
 Pantherodes crassa
 Pantherodes hoplitaria
 Pantherodes leonaria
 Pantherodes obliterata
 Pantherodes olivacea
 Pantherodes pardalaria
 Pantherodes perspicillum
 Pantherodes pumaria
 Pantherodes rhadinaria
 Pantherodes semiconfluens
 Pantherodes unciaria
 Pantherodes viperaria

Description
Moths belonging to this genus have translucent yellow wings with leopard-like blotches.

Distribution
These species can be found the southern states of the United States to Mexico, Costa Rica, Ecuador Bolivia, Venezuela, Peru, Brazil, Paraguay and Argentina.

References

External links
 Caterpillars Life Desks
 Naturaleza Brasileira
 Eco Registros

Geometridae
Geometridae of South America
Moths of South America